Ramadan Offensive may refer to:

Ramadan Offensive (2003)
Ramadan Offensive (2006)